Jeffrey Eyster (born 1970, Minneapolis) is a licensed architect in California, principal of his firm æ architecture, and a member of the American Institute of Architects.

Career
In 2007, Jeffrey Eyster designed and built a sustainable wood and glass modern home in the Hollywood Hills featured in the Los Angeles Times and shortly thereafter photographed by American architectural photographer Julius Shulman. He wrote about Shulman photographing the home for the architectural design magazine Domus. In 2008 Jeffrey Eyster lectured about the home in the context of Hollywood Hills Case Study Houses at the Center of Contemporary Architecture In Moscow Russia. Photographs of the house are presented at Bergamot Station in Santa Monica. The El Segundo Museum of Art exhibited a photo of the home taken by Julius Shulman and Juergen Nogai.

Education
As a student Jeffrey Eyster studied with architectural theorist Lebbeus Woods and Ray Kappe, the founding Director of  the Southern California Institute of Architecture (SCI-Arc) where he received his Master of Architecture.

References

External links
 Official website

1970 births
Living people
Architects from Los Angeles
Architects from Minneapolis
21st-century American architects
Southern California Institute of Architecture alumni